For Ever is the second studio album by British neo soul band, Jungle. The album was released on 14 September 2018 through XL Recordings. It is their final release for XL Recordings before the formation of their own label, Caiola Records, in 2021.

Critical reception

For Ever was met with "generally favorable" reviews from critics. At Metacritic, which assigns a weighted average rating out of 100 to reviews from mainstream publications, this release received an average score of 66, based on 14 reviews.

Track listing

Personnel

Jungle
 Josh Lloyd-Watson – vocals, executive production, engineering, mixing, arrangement, creative direction
 Tom McFarland – vocals, executive production, engineering, mixing, arrangement, creative direction

Additional musicians
 Andro Cowperthwaite – vocals 
 George Day – drums 
 Rudi Salmon – vocals 
 Nat Zangi – vocals 
 Inflo – production , vocals 
 Nick Barr – viola 
 Zara Benyounes – violin 
 Meghan Cassidy – viola 
 Stephanie Cavey – violin 
 Anna Croad – violin 
 Rosie Danvers – cello, string arrangement 
 Eleanor Mathieson – violin 
 Wes Oakland – additional production , programming, guitar & bass 
 Hayley Pomfrett – violin 
 Holly Taylor – vocals 
 Melisa Young – vocals 

Technical personnel
 Alex Baranowski – string arrangement 
 Tom Campbell – engineering assistant
 Matt Colton – mastering
 Joe Mortimer – design & layout
 Oliver Hadlee Pearch – photography
 Charlie Di Placido – creative direction
 Sam Wheat – string recording, engineering
 David Wrench – mixing
 Imran Ahmed – A&R
 Ben Beardsworth – A&R

Charts

References

External links
 

2018 albums
Jungle (band) albums
Albums produced by Jungle (band)
XL Recordings albums
Albums produced by Inflo